Albert Robinson (born November 28, 1964) is an American sprinter. He competed in the men's 4 × 100 metres relay at the 1988 Summer Olympics.

References

External links
 

1964 births
Living people
Athletes (track and field) at the 1988 Summer Olympics
American male sprinters
Olympic track and field athletes of the United States
Track and field athletes from Chicago